is a Japanese author.

Biography 
Kogyoku was born in Kanazawa, Ishikawa Prefecture. 

She then attended Kanazawa University and graduated from the department of literature.

In 2006, her novel Horned Owl and King of the Night was the Grand Prize winner in the thirteenth Dengeki Novel Prize held by ASCII Media Works (formerly MediaWorks).

Works

Light novels
 （Illustrated by:）
 （Illustrated by:）
 （Illustrated by:）
 （Illustrated by:）
 （Illustrated by:）
 （Illustrated by:）

Game scenario
 （Short story in the game — ）

Other
 
 （Illustrated by:HERO）

References

External links
 

1984 births
Living people
Japanese science fiction writers
Light novelists
People from Ishikawa Prefecture